Saint Basil may refer to:

People
Basil the Elder, 4th-century saint, father of Basil the Great
Basil of Caesarea (Basil the Great), 4th century leading churchman
Basil the Confessor, 8th-century saint
Basil the Younger, 10th-century Constantinopolitan ascetic and visionary
Basil Fool for Christ, Russian saint
Basil of Ostrog, Serbian saint
Basil of Ancyra, 4th century martyr

Places
Saint-Basile Parish, New Brunswick, New Brunswick, formerly named St. Basil Parish
St. Basile 10, an Indian reserve surrounded by Edmundston
Saint-Basile, Quebec, Canada
Saint-Basile, Ardèche, France
Saint-Basile-le-Grand, Quebec, Canada
Saint Basil Academy (Garrison, New York)
Saint Basil Academy (Jenkintown, Pennsylvania)
Saint Basil's Cathedral, Moscow, Russia

See also
St. Basil's Church (disambiguation)